FSL may refer to:

Language 
 Filipino Sign Language
 Finnish Sign Language
 French Sign Language

Other uses 
 Fast Simplex Link, a soft microprocessor bus
 Five Schools League, a Northeast United States prep school athletics league
 Fleet Support Limited, a British logistics company
 Florida State League, an American minor baseball league
 Fluid Science Laboratory, on the International Space Station
 FMRIB Software Library
 FM FSL, a rifle
 Folger Shakespeare Library in Washington, D.C., United States
 Forecast Systems Laboratory of the United States National Oceanic and Atmospheric Administration
 Fox Sports Live, an American television program
 Fraternitas Scintilla Legis, a Philippine fraternity
 Freescale Semiconductor, an American semiconductor manufacturer
 Free-space loss
 Friends' School, Lisburn, in Northern Ireland
 Function-spacer-lipid construct